Finding Nemo – The Musical is a live puppet and musical stage show based on Disney/Pixar's 2003 film Finding Nemo, located at the Theater in the Wild in DinoLand U.S.A at Disney's Animal Kingdom in Walt Disney World in Orlando, Florida. The 40-minute show (performed 5–6 times daily) started holding previews on November 5, 2006, officially opening on January 24, 2007. The music, composed by Kristen Anderson-Lopez and her husband, Robert Lopez, the writers behind the scores of Avenue Q, The Book of Mormon, In Transit and Frozen, used direct lines from the film, bringing the film characters to life on stage.

On March 15, 2020, the show had its final performance before Walt Disney World Resort closed due to the COVID-19 outbreak's impact on Florida. However, following Walt Disney World Resort's reopening, it was announced that a new reimagined version of the show entitled Finding Nemo: The Big Blue… and Beyond! that would premiered on June 13, 2022, as part of Walt Disney World Resort's 50th Anniversary celebration.

History
The stage musicals Journey into the Jungle Book and Tarzan Rocks! occupied the Theater in the Wild at DinoLand USA in Disney's Animal Kingdom in Orlando, Florida from 1998 to 2006. These were themed to the  animated films The Jungle Book and Tarzan. After the closure of Tarzan Rocks! in January 2006, rumors began spreading that it would be replaced by a musical adaptation of Finding Nemo. This was confirmed on April 7, 2006, when Disney announced that the musical adaptation of Finding Nemo, with new songs written by Tony Award-winning Avenue Q composer Robert Lopez and his wife, Kristen Anderson-Lopez, would "combine puppets, dancers, acrobats and animated backdrops" and open in late 2006. Years later, Anderson-Lopez explained that she had written a compact 15-minute a cappella version of the story of Oedipus; someone at Disney read it and recognized her talent for condensing material, and offered her the opportunity to make a pitch for the Finding Nemo project.

Tony Award-winning director Peter Brosius signed on to direct the show, with Michael Curry, who designed puppets for Disney's successful stage version of The Lion King, serving as leading puppet and production designer.

Anderson-Lopez said that the couple agreed to write the adaptation of "one of their favorite movies of all time" after considering "the idea of people coming in [to see the musical] at 4, 5 or 6 and saying, 'I want to do that'....So we want to take it as seriously as we would a Broadway show". To condense the feature-length film to 30 minutes, she and Lopez focused on a single theme from the movie, the idea that "the world's dangerous and beautiful".

The show started holding previews on November 5, 2006, officially opening on January 24, 2007. That same month, a New York studio recording of the show was released on iTunes, with Lopez and Anderson-Lopez providing the voices for Marlin and Dory, respectively. Avenue Q star Stephanie D'Abruzzo also appeared on the recording, as Sheldon/Deb. Finding Nemo was the first non-musical animated film to which Disney added songs to produce a stage musical. In 2009, Finding Nemo – The Musical was honored with a Thea Award for Best Live Show from the Themed Entertainment Association.

When Walt Disney World reopened in July 2020 following the COVID-19 pandemic, all stage shows are remained closed due to a dispute between the Actors' Equity Association and Walt Disney World over allowing performers to wear face masks and providing regular testing.

On September 14, 2021, it was announced that a "reimagined" version of the show would open in 2022. However, on November 19, 2021, it was announced that the show would be replaced by a new show entitled Finding Nemo: The Big Blue… and Beyond!.

Plot

The musical is based on the plot of the film Finding Nemo, with characters performed in large puppetry by live actors and dancers on stage. It revolves around Marlin, a widowed clownfish who is desperate to find his son Nemo, who was snatched away by a diver in the ocean. Along the way, Marlin meets Dory, a regal blue tang with short-term memory loss, who ends up accompanying him on his journey. Meanwhile, Nemo ends up in a fish aquarium at a dentist office in Sydney, Australia and meets Gill, a moorish idol living in the dentist's aquarium, and the leader of the Tank Gang, who also live in the aquarium.

Soundtrack
All songs featured were written by Kristen Anderson-Lopez and Robert Lopez. A soundtrack album was released in 2007, with Anderson-Lopez and Lopez providing the voices of Dory and Marlin, respectively.

References

External links
 
 Official site

Amusement park attractions introduced in 2007
Amusement park attractions that closed in 2020
Amusement park attractions introduced in 2022
Walt Disney Parks and Resorts entertainment
Disney's Animal Kingdom
DinoLand U.S.A.
Finding Nemo
Musicals based on animated films